Syed Ahmed Kamran is a Pakistani television director.

Filmography

Television

Drama series directed by Kamran include:

 Taluq (Geo TV)
 Chand Parosa (Geo TV)
 Chemistry (Geo TV)
 Tere Ishq Main (Geo TV)
 Mere Khuwaboon Ka Diya 
 Muhabbat har, Muhabbat Jeet (ATV)  
 Agan (A Plus)
 Arraigned Marriage (ARY Digital)
 Digest Writer (Hum TV)
 Mohabbat Aag Si (Hum TV)
Hiddat (Geo TV)
Mah-e-Tamaam (Hum TV)
Mohabbat Na Kariyo (Geo TV)

Awards and nominations

References

External links
 Syed Ahmed Kamran Biography on Video Pakistan

Living people
People from Karachi
Pakistani male television actors
Pakistani television directors
Year of birth missing (living people)